The Unrelenting Songs of the 1979 Post Disco Crash is a 2004 studio album by American breakcore musician Jason Forrest.

Critical reception

Tim Sendra of AllMusic gave the album 4.5 stars out of 5, describing it as "a Day-Glo burst of wacked-out samples, clattering percussion, sun-kissed melodies, and general electronic insanity. Nate De Young of Stylus Magazine gave the album a grade of A−, saying, "the cockrock-cum-disco king unwittingly uses sampling as a critique of taste that is jaw-dropping and, more importantly, booty-shaking."

In 2017, Pitchfork placed the album at number 50 on its list of "The 50 Best IDM Albums of All Time".

Track listing

References

External links
 

2004 albums
Jason Forrest albums